The 1940 Southampton by-election was held on 1 February 1940.  The by-election was held due to the elevation to the peerage of the incumbent Liberal National MP, Sir Charles Barrie.  It was won by the National candidate Sir John Reith.

References

1940 elections in the United Kingdom
1940 in England
20th century in Southampton
February 1940 events
Elections in Southampton
By-elections to the Parliament of the United Kingdom in Hampshire constituencies
Unopposed by-elections to the Parliament of the United Kingdom (need citation)